Silicon disulfide is the inorganic compound with the formula SiS2.  Like silicon dioxide, this material is polymeric, but it adopts a 1-dimensional structure quite different from the usual forms of SiO2.

Synthesis, structure, and properties
The material is formed by heating silicon and sulfur or by the exchange reaction between SiO2 and Al2S3.  The material consists of chains of edge-shared tetrahedra, Si(μ-S)2Si(μS)2, etc.

Like other silicon sulfur-compounds (e.g., bis(trimethylsilyl)sulfide) SiS2 hydrolyzes readily to release H2S.
In liquid ammonia it is reported to form the imide Si(NH)2 and NH4SH, but a recent report has identified crystalline (NH4)2[SiS3(NH3)]·2NH3 as a product which contains the tetrahedral thiosilicate anion, SiS3(NH3).

Reaction with ethanol gives the alkoxide tetraethyl orthosilicate and H2S. With bulky tert-butanol, alcoholysis gives tris(tert-butoxy)silanethiol:
3 (CH3)3COH  +  SiS2    →    [(CH3)3CO]3SiSH  +  H2S

Reaction with sodium sulfide, magnesium sulfide and aluminum sulfide give thiosilicates.

SiS2 is claimed to occur in certain interstellar objects.

References

Inorganic silicon compounds
Sulfides
Inorganic polymers
Dichalcogenides